WebChat Broadcasting System, or WBS for short, was a virtual community created during the 1990s. Supported by online advertising, it was one of few services at the time to offer free integrated community services including chat rooms, message boards, and free personal web pages. Extremely popular during the mid to late 1990s in the era prior to the Dot-com bust, WBS was the largest and best-known social media website of its time. In 1998, WBS was acquired by the search engine Infoseek, which was in turn acquired by Disney/ABC. The original WebChat Broadcasting System closed on 15 September 1999 after its chat rooms were integrated into Disney's existing Go Network chat rooms. A revival of WBS was launched in 2009 and is virtually identical to the original community.

Features

WBS featured browser-based chat, real-time discussion, with moderated chat rooms in addition to user-created private chat rooms. Common to webchat, its chat rooms required no software download to use. It allowed users to upload their own images into chat sessions and had three chat modes: streaming, frames, and no frames. In addition to images users could add audio, video, and hotlinks to conversations.  WBS also featured other services, such as email, and allowed users to create and maintain personal web pages. Membership was free.

History

Founding
WBS was founded as the Internet Roundtable Society in 1990 by Michael J. Fremont and Wendie Bernstein Lash in Menlo Park, California. It began as an "edutainment" company featuring such content as live Internet broadcasts of interviews with prominent individuals in science, technology, and pop culture, but began focusing on chat in 1993, whereupon the name was changed to the WebChat Broadcasting System.

Growth

IRC had existed as a dedicated chatting network but was mostly used by seasoned Internet users. Chat websites capitalized on the growing base of Internet general users by providing a simpler, more attractive chatting interface. Chatting became focused on community and socialization.

In August 1996, WBS had 500,000 users and was growing by 3,000 users a day.

In February 1997, WBS reached a milestone of 1 million registered users, accruing 4,000 new registered users and 5.5 million page views every day. Registrations were not confirmed. At this point, it was featuring 200 individual affinity groups. Within a week of the launch of a new feature to allow members to create their own home pages, over 15,000 members had begun using it.

In May 1997, WBS had 1.4 million registered users. The other large web chat company at this time was WebGenesis Inc.'s The Globe. Also internet service provider AOL had over 14,000 chat rooms available to their customers through their non-web interface.

In June 1997, WBS hit 1.5 million registered users and had 7 million daily page views with over 200 rooms.

WBS frequently hosted real-time multimedia programming events, which only increased as its popularity grew. Such events attracted celebrities such as Tom Clancy, the celebrity cast of Star Trek, bands Soundgarden and Metallica, the former president of PBS, Lawrence Grossman from NBC News, United States Senator Arlen Specter, Intel CEO Andy Grove and feminist Gloria Steinem.

Rise of instant messaging
Web-based chatting in general began to lose popularity with the rise of several instant messaging desktop applications in the late 1990s. ICQ was first released in November 1996. AOL Instant Messenger was released in May 1997. Yahoo! Pager, later renamed Yahoo! Messenger, launched on 9 March 1998. AOL acquired ICQ's parent company Mirabilis on 8 June 1998. MSN Messenger from Microsoft, later renamed Windows Live Messenger, debuted on 22 July 1999.

Infoseek buyout and demise
Infoseek bought out WBS for approximately $6.7 million, or about 350,000 shares of Infoseek stock in April 1998. At the time WBS had 2.7 million users.

WBS daily page views were down to 5 million in April, 1998.

When Infoseek acquired WBS there had been several web portals that added chat as a service. Lycos had bought the Tripod community in February 1998 and Yahoo had added a deal with GeoCities in January 1998. There was strong competition between the web portals to match each other's services. WBS, at the time of the Infoseek acquisition, had 2.7 million registered users. This total was more than the membership of Tripod and GeoCities combined. WBS had only 350,000 personal homepages at the time. Infoseek's three main competitors at the time were Lycos, Yahoo, and Excite.

In 1998, Infoseek was purchased by the Go Network. On September 15, 1999, WBS was shut down and many of the more popular rooms were transferred to Go's Java-based chat system. All that was left for the members at that time was this simple message: "Go.Com has decided to close down WBS and move its most popular rooms to the chat rooms at Go.Com. Your home pages will still be viewable for an undetermined amount of time. Thank you for supporting WBS during its existence." By the Spring of 2000, all home pages had been deleted. Go.com abandoned chat entirely in 2001.

Migration
After its demise, many patrons of WBS migrated to other chat sites where some of the general topic rooms were recreated. Notable sites created in the wake of WBS' closure included bigbob.com and mywbs.com, both of which were created by former WBS chatters, utilizing a similar browser-based chat system. It is likely that many WBS users migrated to instant messaging software, the popularity of which was increasing substantially at that time.

Martin Foster developed software that offered several of the features of the original WBS and IFC that had gained popularity. This code has been used in developing numerous chat sites which have attracted many former patrons of the original WBS, especially those who frequented the roleplaying rooms. It was originally developed to power Ethereal Realms, but the site now merely hosts the software for use on other sites.

Audience
WBS offered a wide array of chat rooms categorized into hubs. Many rooms were dedicated to affinity groups based on age, race/ethnicity, religion, and sexuality. Others were specific to topics such as dating, entertainment, computers and the internet, travel, video games, roleplaying games, and the arts. The site would eventually host around 260 different chat rooms.

Executives
President and CEO Bayard Winthrop was a frequent spokesperson for the company. After its buyout, he co-founded Freebord, a San Francisco-based sporting goods manufacturer, in January 2001. From 2008 to 2011, Winthrop was the CEO of Chrome Industries. He left in March 2011 and proceeded to found American Giant.

2009 revival
In July 2009,  classic-wbs.net, a revival of WBS and virtually identical to the original community, was launched; most of the original chat rooms and features have been retained or recreated. The most noticeable differences are the lack of personal homepages and the chat rooms are not moderated.

See also
 Web chat
 Dot-com company

References

Further reading
 
  This paper discusses the place of WBS and the special interest rooms Nia's Tavern and the Inn of the Weary Traveler in the development of online RPG gaming.

External links
 WebChat Broadcasting System (archived at the Wayback Machine)
 Revived WebChat Broadcasting System 
 Homepage of WBS co-founder Wendie Bernstein Lash
 Transcript of an Internet Roundtable Society webcast of an interview between WBS co-founder Michael J. Fremont and Dr. Robert Ballard (archived at the Wayback Machine)
 Transcript of an Internet Roundtable Society interview between WBS co-founder Wendie Bernstein Lash and Gloria Steinem, from the Women in Technology International (WITI) Conference in 1995 (archived at the Wayback Machine)
 Fate's Labyrinth, a website that originally began as a chat room on WBS called Nia's Tavern
 Infinity Bound

Defunct social networking services
Companies based in Menlo Park, California